Skaraborg Brigade, designation PB 9 and MekB9, was a Swedish Army armoured brigade. It was set up in infantry regiment in 1942, as one of Sweden's first armoured brigades. The brigade's soldiers were mostly trained in the Skaraborg Regiment (P 4).

History 
In 1994, the brigade was separated from its regiment. The brigade was decommissioned on June 30, 2000 and the regiment was re-established under its old name, Skaraborg Regiment (P 4).

Heraldry and traditions
The Skaraborg Brigade shared heraldry and traditions with the Skaraborg Regiment. In the years 1998–2000, the brigade managed the traditions of the regiment.

When the Skaraborg Brigade was disbanded in 2000, the Skaraborgs regementes och Skaraborgsbrigadens (MekB 9) förtjänstmedalj ("Skaraborg Regiment and Skaraborg Brigade (MekB 9) Medal of Merit") in gold and silver (SkarabregbrigGM/SM) of the 8th size was established in 1999. The medal ribbon is divided in black and yellow moiré with a white stripe on the middle followed on both sides by a red stripe.

Commanding officers
1949–1989: ?
1989–1992: Colonel Alf Sandqvist
1992–1994: ?
1994–1995: Colonel  Peter Lundberg
1995–1999: Colonel Tony Stigsson
1999–2000: Colonel  Jörgen Britzen

Names, designations and locations

See also
 List of Swedish Army brigades

Footnotes

References

Notes

Print

Brigades of the Swedish Army
Military units and formations established in 1949
Military units and formations disestablished in 2000
Disbanded units and formations of Sweden
1949 establishments in Sweden
2000 disestablishments in Sweden
Skövde Garrison